HSBC Main Building is a headquarters building of The Hongkong and Shanghai Banking Corporation, which is today a wholly owned subsidiary of London-based HSBC Holdings. It is located on the southern side of Statue Square near the location of the old City Hall, Hong Kong (built in 1869, demolished in 1933). The previous HSBC building was built in 1935 and pulled down to make way for the current building. The address remains as 1 Queen's Road Central (the north facing side of the building was served by Des Voeux Road Central, which was the seashore, making Queen's Road the main entrance, in contrast to the current primary access coming from Des Voeux Road).

History

First building
The first HSBC (then known as the Hong Kong and Shanghai Banking Company Limited) building was Wardley House, used as an HSBC office between 1865 and 1882 on the present site. In 1864 the lease cost HKD 500 a month. After raising a capital of HKD 5 million, the bank opened its doors in 1865.

Second building
Wardley House was subsequently demolished and replaced by a second HSBC building that was completed in 1886. The main feature of the second building design was the division of the structure into two almost separate buildings. The building on Queen's Road Central was in Victorian style with a verandah, colonnades and an octagonal dome, whereas an arcade which harmonised with the adjacent buildings was constructed on Des Voeux Road. It was designed by Clement Palmer in 1883.

Third building
In 1934, the second building was demolished and a third design was erected. The new building opened in October 1935. Upon completion, the building stood as the tallest building in Hong Kong and "the largest building in the Far East", "the tallest structure in South East Asia", and "tallest building between Cairo and San Francisco". The third design used part of the land of the old City Hall, and was built in a mixed Art Deco and Stripped Classical style. During the Japanese occupation of Hong Kong between 1941 and 1945, the building served as the government headquarters. It was the first building in Asia to be fully air-conditioned. By the 1970s, the bank had outgrown its headquarters; departments were scattered into offices all over Central, and it was obvious that such a "solution" to the space limitations could not continue indefinitely. In 1978, the bank decided to tear down its headquarters and construct a new, larger headquarters building.

Current building
The new building is a steel suspended structure and was finished on 18 November 1985. At the time, it was the most expensive building in the world (c.a.HK$5.2 billion, roughly US$668 million).

The first major addition to the building, designed by Hong Kong's One Space Ltd, was completed on 23 November 2006, in the form of a ground floor lobby that improves security access to the upper floors and creates a prestigious reception area. Its design and construction included the installation of the "Asian Story Wall", a multimedia installation consisting of twin banks of 30 seamless plasma screens (the largest installation of its kind in Hong Kong) displaying archived bank heritage and artworks.

The atrium of the HSBC building was the site of the Occupy Hong Kong protests which maintained a presence in the building from 15 October 2011 until their eviction in September 2012.

Design
The new building was designed by the British architect Norman Foster and civil & structural engineers Ove Arup & Partners with service design by J. Roger Preston & Partners. It was constructed by the John Lok / Wimpey Joint Venture. From the concept to completion, it took seven years (1978–1985). The building is 180 metres high with 47 storeys and four basement levels. The building has a modular design consisting of five steel modules, which were prefabricated in the UK by Scott Lithgow Shipbuilders near Glasgow and shipped to Hong Kong. About 30,000 tons of steel and 4,500 tons of aluminium were used.

The original design was heavily inspired by the Douglas Gilling designed Qantas International Centre in Sydney (currently known as Suncorp Place).

The new lobby and its two-part Asian Story Wall were designed by Greg Pearce, of One Space Limited. Pearce was also the Principal Architect of the Hong Kong Airport Express (MTR) station. Conceived as a minimalist glass envelope, the new lobby is designed to be deferential to Foster's structure and appears almost to be part of the original.

A notable feature is that natural sunlight is the major source of lighting inside the building. There is a bank of giant mirrors at the top of the atrium, which can reflect natural sunlight into the atrium and hence down into the plaza. Through the use of natural sunlight, this design helps to conserve energy. Additionally, sun shades are provided on the external facades to block direct sunlight going into the building and to reduce heat gain. Instead of fresh water, sea water is used as coolant for the air-conditioning system.

The building is also one of the few to not have lifts as the primary carrier of building traffic. Instead, lifts only stop every few floors, and floors are interconnected by escalators.

Structural features 

The main characteristic of HSBC's Hong Kong headquarters is its absence of internal supporting structure. The inverted 'va' segments of the suspension trusses spanning the construction at double-height levels is the most obvious characteristic of the building. It consists of eight groups of four aluminium-clad steel columns which ascend from the foundations up through the core structure, and five levels of triangular suspension trusses which are locked into these masts.

All flooring is made from lightweight movable panels, under which lies a comprehensive network of power, telecommunication, and air-conditioning systems. This design was to allow equipment such as computer terminals to be installed quickly and easily. Because of the urgency to finish the project, the construction of the building relied heavily on off-site prefabrication; components were manufactured all over the world. For example, the structural steel came from Britain; the glass, aluminium cladding and flooring came from the United States while the service modules came from Japan.

Feng shui

The early British settlers in Hong Kong had an interest in feng shui; thus, most of the earliest buildings in Hong Kong, and many buildings constructed thereafter, were built with the philosophies of feng shui in mind. The Chinese believe that those who have a direct view of a body of water—whether it is a river, a sea, or an ocean—are more likely to prosper than those who do not (water is strongly associated with wealth in feng shui). The HSBC building has a wide open area (the Statue Square) in front of it, with no other buildings blocking its view of Victoria Harbour; thus, it is considered to have "good feng shui".

In the CBC Television series Doc Zone episode "Superstitious Minds", Writer, Researcher & Associate Producer Tom Puchniak asserts that the design of the nearby Bank of China Tower ignored feng shui principles, and created instant controversy by evoking two knife edges, one pointing towards the British Government House, another towards the HSBC building. After the Bank of China building opened, a series of mishaps occurred, including the death of the Governor, and a downturn in the city's economy. It is alleged that HSBC installed two maintenance cranes in the shape of cannons on the roof, pointing directly at the Bank of China, to defend against the negative energy from the Bank of China building. According to feng shui master Paul Hung, this solved the problem, and HSBC experienced "no harmful results after that."

Lion statues

When HSBC decided to build its third headquarters at 1 Queen's Road Central, opened in 1935, it commissioned two bronze lions from Shanghai-based British sculptor W W Wagstaff (d 1977, aged 82). This commission was inspired by two earlier lions that had been ordered for the new Shanghai office opened in 1923. Cast by J W Singer & Sons in the English town of Frome, to a design by Henry Poole RA, these lions had quickly become part of the Shanghai scene, and passers-by would affectionately stroke the lions in the belief that power and money would rub off on them. They became known as Stephen and Stitt: an in-joke. Stephen was named for A. G. Stephen, formerly Manager Shanghai, and in 1923 the Chief Manager of HSBC, and G H Stitt, the then Manager Shanghai. Stephen is depicted roaring, Stitt quiescent, and again insiders said that this represented the characters of these two famous bankers.

Wagstaff worked with "Shanghai Arts and Crafts" foreman Chou Yin Hsiang who in an interview with John Loch of HSBC's house magazine "Group News" in June 1977 recalled that when he first joined Arts and Crafts he worked with Wagstaff for two years to make the lions, without having to learn a word of English: Wagstaff spoke perfect Shanghai dialect. Hunch-backed, Wagstaff was nicknamed "Lao Doo Pei", meaning "Old Hunchback". His son, inevitably, was called "Sau Doo Pei"—"Young Hunchback". Wagstaff had two sons—Don, killed in Naval service in the war, and Alex, killed while interned in Shanghai by the Japanese. Chou Yin Hsiang himself came to Hong Kong in 1935, and by 1977, was the proprietor of Jeh Hsing Metal Works—and still casting bronze for HSBC.

Like the Shanghai lions, the Hong Kong lions became objects of veneration, and foci of the Bank's perceived excellent feng shui. Young couples still bring their toddlers to stroke the paws and noses of the statues hoping for luck and prosperity.

When the 1935 building closed its doors for the last time on 26 June 1981 the Lions had been moved to the annexe on 19 June 1981. Demolition, by China Swiss Engineers, started on 6 July 1981. The lions were temporarily moved on 4 June 1982 to Statue Square, opposite the main entrance. As a mark of the respect the lions were held in, the move to Statue Square, and the move back in 1985, were accompanied by the chairman Sir Michael Sandberg and senior management of the Bank and the placement of the lions both temporarily and in their current locations was made only after extensive consultations with feng shui practitioners.

Their 4-year sojourn in the annexe and Statue Square aside, the lions have only left their positions as guardians of the Des Voeux Road entrance of the Bank once: they were confiscated by the Japanese and sent to Japan to be melted down. Luckily the war ended before this could happen, and the lions were recognised by an American sailor in a dockyard in Osaka in 1945. They were returned a few months later and restored to their original positions in October 1946.

The Hong Kong lions are also called Stephen and Stitt, and the Hong Kong Stephen has bullet or shrapnel scars in its left hind-quarters dating from the fighting in the Battle of Hong Kong. When this pair of lions was used as the model for the pair commissioned for the new UK Headquarters of HSBC in 2002, Zambian-born New Zealand sculptor Mark Kennedy was asked not to reproduce these "war wounds" in the copies as the shrapnel marks were seen as historical battle-scars of sorts.

The following is a list of bronze copies and re-casts of the HSBC lions:
 In Hong Kong:
 Hong Kong (1935) – modelled on Shanghai originals; sculpted by W W Wagstaff, cast by Shanghai Arts and Crafts.
Hong Kong (replicas) (2015) – copies of Hong Kong lions; for the celebration of the 150th anniversary of HSBC; placed at the lobby of HSBC Centre, HSBC's back office headquarter in Hong Kong.
 In China:
 Shanghai (original) (1923) – sculpted by Henry Poole RA, cast by J W Stinger & Sons. The originals are held by the Shanghai Historic Museum (which currently has no permanent home) and are separately on display at the Museum's display room under the Oriental Pearl Tower (Stephen) and the Shanghai Banking Museum (Stitt), both in Lujiazui.
 Shanghai (replicas) (c. 1997) – copies of Shanghai originals, commissioned by the government-owned Shanghai Pudong Development Bank after it obtained the former HSBC building.
 Shanghai (current) (2010) – copies of Hong Kong lions.
 In the United Kingdom
London (2001) – copies of Hong Kong lions; cast by Bronze Age Foundry, Limehouse, at the direction of Mark Kennedy.
Birmingham (2018) – copies of Hong Kong lions.

Various other HSBC branches throughout the world feature small-scaled replicas of these originals, with varying degrees of faithfulness. Other HSBC branches often feature guardian lions to different designs, such as Chinese guardian lions.

Lighting scheme

In 2003, the Hong Kong Tourism Board developed a harbour lighting plan called "A Symphony of Lights", a large-scale multimedia show featuring lighting, laser, music, and occasionally special pyrotechnics effects during festivals, to promote tourism in Hong Kong. The show was based on the illumination of key buildings on the Hong Kong Island side, and was best viewed from the Kowloon side across the Victoria Harbour. The HSBC Hong Kong headquarters building was one of the participating buildings in the show.

See also
 List of buildings and structures in Hong Kong
 Timeline of tallest buildings in Hong Kong
 Economy of Hong Kong
 HSBC Centre in Tai Kok Tsui, Kowloon

References

Further reading

External links

 The Hongkong and Shanghai Banking Corporation: Unique Headquarters
 HSBC Headquarters Building in Hong Kong – from different angles
 Foster and Partners (Official Architect Website)
 One Space Limited (New lobby and Asian History Wall architect)
 Recent illumination of the HSBC Headquarters Building in Hong Kong

Bank buildings in Hong Kong
Central, Hong Kong
High-tech architecture
HSBC buildings and structures
Landmarks in Hong Kong
Foster and Partners buildings
Office buildings completed in 1985
Skyscraper office buildings in Hong Kong
Suspended structures